The Buckingham House is a historic brickhouse in Sevierville, Tennessee, U.S.. Built in 1795 by Thomas Buckingham, the first sheriff of Sevier County, it is the oldest house in the county. It was designed in the Federal architectural style. It is listed on the National Register of Historic Places.

History
The land was home to Cherokees until European settlers, led by John Sevier, chased them away between 1776 and 1785. It was subsequently purchased from Sevier by Thomas Buckingham, who served as the first sheriff of Sevier County.

With his brother Ephriam, Thomas Buckingham built this brickhouse in 1795, making it the oldest remaining house in Sevier County. It was designed in the Federal architectural style. It overlooks the French Broad River.

By 1890, an additional ell, with two rooms and a porch, was built.

The house has been listed on the National Register of Historic Places since March 18, 1971.

See also
List of the oldest buildings in Tennessee

References

External links

Houses on the National Register of Historic Places in Tennessee
Federal architecture in Tennessee
Houses completed in 1795
Houses in Sevier County, Tennessee
1795 establishments in the Southwest Territory